Trinitroanisole is a chemical compound that exists as pale yellow crystals with a melting point of  68 °C. It is an explosive with a detonation velocity of 7200 meters per second.

Synthesis
Trinitroanisole was first prepared in 1849 by the French chemist Auguste Cahours by reacting p-anisic acid (French: acide anisique) with a mixture of sulfuric acid and fuming nitric acid.   

Trinitroanisole can be prepared by the reaction of 2,4-dinitrochlorobenzene with methanol in the presence of sodium hydroxide followed by the nitration of the resulting product. Alternatively, it can be prepared directly by the reaction of picryl chloride with methanol in the presence of sodium hydroxide.

Use
Historically, trinitroanisole was used as a military explosive (e.g., Japanese ), however, due to its tendency to form picric acid and dangerous picrate salts, its use has largely been abandoned.

Notes

Explosive chemicals
Nitrobenzenes